Nikel (lit. nickel; ; Norwegian: Nikkel) is an urban locality (an urban-type settlement) and the administrative center of Pechengsky District of Murmansk Oblast, Russia, located on the shores of Lake Kuets-Yarvi  northwest of Murmansk and  from the Norwegian border on . Population:    18,000 (1973).

History
In the 1920 Treaty of Tartu, Soviet Russia ceded the area of Petsamo to Finland. In the 1930s huge reserves of nickel were found on fells nearby. The amount was estimated to be five million tons. In 1934, the Finnish Government awarded the mining right to the British Mond Nickel Co, subsidiary of International Nickel Co (Inco), that founded the Petsamon Nikkeli Oy mining company. The company began building a railway, as well as other infrastructure, between the town, then known as Kolosjoki, and Liinahamari harbor.

In the Winter War of 1939–1940, the Soviet Union occupied Petsamo. In the following peace agreement only the Finnish part of the Rybachy Peninsula was ceded to the Soviet Union, although the Soviets had occupied all of Petsamo during the war. In summer 1940, the Finnish government took over the mines from the British company. The first mining operations began in the same year. During World War II, the ore was mainly sold to Germany. The hydro power plant in Jäniskoski started operations in 1942, making it possible to smelt the ore locally.

In December 1943 Albert Speer, German Minister of Armaments and War Production, flew on an inspection tour to Kolosjoki, which by then was the sole supplier of nickel to the Third Reich. Captured during the invasion of Russia, the mines’ ore heaps remained in the yards and had not been shipped out due to a priority of bomb-proofing the power station and smelter. By placing the power plant security on a lower priority, Speer was able to make the transportation shipments of the vital ore to Germany move quicker.

In 1944, the Red Army occupied Petsamo, and Finland had to cede it to the Soviet Union as part of the Moscow Armistice signed on September 19, 1944. Retreating German forces destroyed the power plant and partially the smelter. On July 21, 1945, the Presidium of the Supreme Soviet of the Soviet Union decreed to establish Pechengsky District with the administrative center in Nikel on the ceded territory and to include this district as a part of Murmansk Oblast.

Ecology

The town is linked to the Norilsk Nickel plant Kola MMC nearby where many of its citizens are employed and which causes environmental and health concerns for the population. The nickel smelter which has been an eyesore in Norway–Russia relations for decades due to its extreme pollution levels usually deposits its sulfur dioxide fumes to the south of the town where the countryside is a brown moonscape of bald hills, barren of plant life for kilometers around. In the summertime, the toxic fumes which for the rest of the year rarely blow northwards towards the town occasionally do just that, making breathing difficult and even burning holes in people's umbrellas. Over the last 15 years, however, SO2 emissions from Kola MMC have lowered significantly from 191,000 tonnes in 2001 to 119,700 tonnes in 2016, provides company data. By 2025, Norilsk Nickel plans to reduce its overall emissions by 90% as part of its long-term development programme announced in 2019.

Recent events
The video of English alternative rock band White Lies, Farewell to the Fairground, was filmed there in early 2009.

Sister City
 Kirkenes, Norway

References

Notes

Sources

External links

Official website of Nikel 

Urban-type settlements in Murmansk Oblast
Monotowns in Russia
Pechengsky District